John Wesley Hales (Ashby de la Zouch, Leicestershire, 5 October 1836 - London, 19 May 1914), was a British scholar and man of letters.

Life
John Wesley Hales was educated at Louth grammar school, Glasgow High School, Durham School, Glasgow University and Christ's College, Cambridge, which elected him to a fellowship. Until 1903, when he retired, he was professor of English literature at King's College London.

In May 1901 he was elected an Honorary Fellow of Christ's College, Cambridge.

He married  Henrietta  Trafford, daughter of judge Richard Leigh Trafford and Eliza Frances Tarleton, in 1867.

Works
Hales published 109 works in 300 publications in 5 languages. A selection is shown below.
 Bell's Handbooks of English Literature (general editor)
 Milton's Areopagitica (1874)
 Percy Folio Manuscript (1867-8) (co-editor)
 Longer English Poems (1872, 1884)  (editor)
 Notes and Essays on Shakespeare (1884) 
 Essays and Notes on Shakespeare (1892) 
 Folia Litteraria: Essays and Notes on English Literature (1893) 
 Snell's Age of Chaucer and Seccombe (introduction)
 Allen's Age of Shakespeare
 The Eve of St. Agnes by John Keats with Philological and Explanatory Notes by J.W. Hales (1889)

Contributions to the Dictionary of National Biography, 1885-1900
 William Langland

Edited works
 Complete Works of Edmund Spenser: A Variorum Edition (1893)

References

External links

Correspondence from John Wesley Hales, Professor of English at King's College, London, sometime of Louth at Lincolnshire Archives
 
 

1836 births
1914 deaths
People educated at King Edward VI Grammar School, Louth
People educated at the High School of Glasgow
People educated at Durham School
Alumni of Christ's College, Cambridge
Academics of King's College London
19th-century British writers
British editors